This is a list of scholarly publishing "sting operations" such as the Sokal affair. These are nonsense papers that were accepted by an academic journal or academic conference; the list does not include cases of scientific misconduct. The intent of such publications is typically to expose shortcomings in a journal's peer review process or to criticize the standards of pay-to-publish journals. The ethics of academic stings are disputed, with some arguing that it is morally equivalent to other forms of fraud.

Notable examples

Chemistry
 "Who's Afraid of Peer Review?": In 2013 John Bohannon wrote in Science about a "sting operation" he conducted in which he submitted "a credible but mundane scientific paper, one with such grave errors that a competent peer reviewer should easily identify it as flawed and unpublishable", to 304 open-access publishers. 157 journals accepted the paper. There have been some objections to the sting's methodology and about what conclusions can be drawn from it.

Computer science
 A paper randomly generated by the SCIgen program was accepted without peer-review for presentation at the United States-based World Multiconference on Systemics, Cybernetics and Informatics (WMSCI). The conference accepted the article as a non-peer reviewed submission, despite none of the three assigned peer-reviewers having submitted an opinion about its fidelity, veracity, or accuracy to its subject. The three MIT graduate students who wrote the hoax article said they were unaware of the Sokal Affair until after submitting their article. Subsequently, numerous other papers generated by SCIgen have been published in scientific journals or accepted for presentation at scientific conferences.
 In December 2013, a Pune-based software professional submitted a bogus paper titled "use of cloud-computing and social media to determine box office performance", which was accepted by the Bhubaneswar-based Research Forum for their ICRIEST-AICEEMCS International Conference. The paper's introductory section itself cautioned that it contained some "gibberish" that was auto-generated by software. One section of the paper also includes 19 lines about the 1970s Bollywood film Sholay, and 19 lines from My Cousin Vinny, a 1992 Hollywood film. The incident highlighted a practice where "poor quality papers are accepted from students who are then asked to pay a few thousand rupees to participate in the conferences". After that the management of the event retracted the paper and apologized publicly. The Secretary in an interview described the acceptance as a human error of the coordinators.
 In 2014, Australian computer scientist Peter Vamplew submitted a paper to the International Journal of Advanced Computer Technology (IJACT) after being angered that the journal would not take his email off its mailing list. The article, titled "Get me off your fucking mailing list", consisted of the phrase "Get me off your fucking mailing list" being repeated for the entirety of the article body. The journal requested the researcher to "add some more recent references and do a bit of reformatting" saying that the article's "suitability for the journal was excellent". Despite this however, he was never taken off the mailing list.

Education
 In 2020, Bradley Allf, a researcher at North Carolina State University, was invited to submit a paper to the journal US-China Education Reviews A&B, one of many journals run by David Publishing Company. Suspecting the journal was predatory, Allf submitted a nonsense paper espousing the educational benefits of high school students manufacturing drugs in the New Mexico desert, loosely following the plot of the television series Breaking Bad. The paper was authored by Allf as well as fictional Breaking Bad characters Walter White and Jesse Pinkman. In it, Allf claims to have demonstrated that "at-risk" high school students in a chemistry course can benefit from field trips into the desert to make methamphetamine. The paper makes a number of obviously untrue claims, including that Albuquerque is part of the Galápagos Islands, that craniotomy is an effective means of assessing student learning, and that humans did not appear in the New Mexico "fossil record" until 108 years ago. Additionally, the paper's methodology utilizes invented statistical techniques named after Pokémon and, according to the paper, its figures were created in Microsoft Paint. Despite the obvious issues with the paper, Allf's submission was accepted by the journal two weeks after undergoing a supposedly "rigorous" two-person peer review. Allf later wrote an article for Undark Magazine and delivered a TEDx talk about the fake paper and how predatory publishing can be used to sow disinformation.

Mathematics
 In 2012, the open-access journal Advances in Pure Mathematics accepted a nonsense paper produced by the computer program Mathgen. Although the paper was accepted, the "author" declined to pay the journal's $500 publishing fee.

Medicine
 John McLachlan, a professor of medical education, hoaxed the Jerusalem Conference on Integrative Medicine in 2010 with invented nonsense.
 Elaine Murphy hoaxed the British Medical Journal in 1974 with a case report on the fictional medical condition cello scrotum.
 In March 2012, Salvo Di Grazia, a gynecologist and a science communicator in the medical field, submitted a hoax to the World Cancer Congress 2012 organized by the Dalian-based BIT Life Sciences predatory company. Di Grazia created a fictional character, doctor Massimo Della Serietà (which in italian reads as "maximum seriousness"), Corporate Refectory Chief, Rocco Siffredi Foundation, Department of Women Health, Venice, Italy, to show how predatory companies works to people without knowledge about scientific publishing. The work, written in a scientific language but filled with nonsensical methods and statistics, suggested that "endovaginal use of gherkin is an effective and safe therapy for women premenstrual syndrome". The work was accepted despite the fact that all of the authors and their institution were nonexistent. The following year the company proposed to the fictional doctor Della Serietà to apply for the session chair position. This time Di Grazia submitted the work "The 'Sbudella method:' a new, effective way to treat people with hole on the stomach", which was nothing but the recipe for carbonara, which again was promptly accepted.
 In February 2014, Hatixhe Latifi Pupovci, a professor from the University of Prishtina, submitted a flawed paper to Medical Archives, a journal published in Bosnia and Herzegovina. On 14 April 2014 she received a reminder to pay the publication fee of 250 EUR, which she never did, whereas the paper was already published in the journal four days earlier. In July 2014, the editor of the journal, Izet Masic, published an editorial titled “A New Example of Unethical Behaviour in the Academic Journal ‘Medical Archives,” calling out Latifi-Pupovci’s actions and declaring that paper would be retracted.
 In December 2014, Mark Shrime, then a graduate student at Harvard University and now the chair of global surgery at the Royal College of Surgeons in Ireland, used a random text generator to create a gibberish paper entitled "Cuckoo for Cocoa Puffs." He submitted this paper, whose authors were listed as Pinkerton LeBrain and Orson Welles, to 37 medical journals. It was accepted into 17 of them.
 In August 2020, graduate student Mathieu Rebeaud, general practitioner Michaël Rochoy, nuclear medicine intern Valentin Ruggeri and professor of philosophy Florian Cova hoaxed the predatory Asian Journal of Medicine and Health with an article titled SARS-CoV-2 was Unexpectedly Deadlier than Push-scooters: Could Hydroxychloroquine be the Unique Solution?. The authors list include none other than the then French president's dog, Nemo.
 In March 2020, Matan Shelomi published a paper to American Journal of Biomedical Science & Research, published by the predatory publisher Sciencedomain International, claiming that eating the Pokémon Zubat sparked the spread of COVID-19.

Philosophy
 In April 2015, philosophers Philippe Huneman and Anouk Barberousse published a hoax article entitled “Ontology, Neutrality and the Strive for (non-)Being-Queer" in the journal Badiou Studies. The paper was submitted under the pen name Benedetta Tripodi and was subsequently retracted. The parody was designed to undermine the foundation of Alain Badiou's thought. The hoax was exposed in the French newspaper Libération with the support of Alan Sokal, among others. Answering critics who denounced Huneman and Barberousse's strategy as one of avoidance rather than criticism, the authors of the Libération article  pointed to Jonathan Swift's A Modest Proposal to show that publishing satire is sometimes a good way to voice criticism. The difference between satire and a hoax is ultimately subjective, after all.

Physics
 Christoph Bartneck, an associate professor in Information Technology at New Zealand's University of Canterbury, was invited to submit a paper to the 2016 International Conference on Atomic and Nuclear Physics organised by ConferenceSeries. With little knowledge of nuclear physics, he used iOS's auto-complete function to write the paper, choosing randomly from its suggestions after starting each sentence, and submitted it under the name Iris Pear (a reference to Siri and Apple). A sample sentence from the abstract for the resulting manuscript was: "The atoms of a better universe will have the right for the same as you are the way we shall have to be a great place for a great time to enjoy the day you are a wonderful person to your great time to take the fun and take a great time and enjoy the great day you will be a wonderful time for your parents and kids". The 516-word abstract contained the words "good" and "great" a combined total of 28 times (and is available online). Despite making no sense, the work was accepted within three hours of submission and a conference registration fee of US$1,099 requested. ConferenceSeries is associated with the OMICS Publishing Group, which produces open access journals widely regarded as predatory, and has been accused of moving into "predatory meetings". Bartneck said he was "reasonably certain that this is a money-making conference with little to no commitment to science," given the poor quality of the review process and the high cost of attendance.

Political science
 In 2017, geographer Reuben Rose-Redwood sent a pitch to 13 editors of academic journals who supported the publication of Bruce Gilley's paper "The Case for Colonialism". Rose-Redwood proposed a special issue on "The Costs and Benefits of Genocide: Towards a Balanced Debate". Only one editor raised ethical concerns about the proposal.

Psychology
 In 2007, Tomasz Witkowski published a fake article in the psychology journal Charaktery, which described a psychotherapeutic method based on a pseudoscientific theory of Rupert Sheldrake. According to Witkowski, the editorial board assisted in adding plagiarized content about Sheldrake to the submission.

Social studies
 The Sokal affair: Alan Sokal, a physics professor at New York University and University College London, wrote a paper titled "Transgressing the Boundaries: Towards a Transformative Hermeneutics of Quantum Gravity", which proposed that quantum gravity is a social and linguistic construct. The paper was published in the United States-based Social Text spring/summer 1996 "Science Wars" issue. At that time, the journal did not practice academic peer review and it did not submit the article for outside expert review by a physicist. On the day of its publication in May 1996, Sokal revealed in Lingua Franca that the article was a hoax.
 The Sociétés hoax: Using a false identity, Manuel Quinon and Arnaud Saint-Martin submitted an intentionally inept and absurd article on the "Autolib'", a small rentable car in Paris, to Michel Maffesoli's Sociétés journal. The article was deliberately incoherent and plastered with liberal quotes and references to Maffesoli and other postmodern thinkers. The article was duly "reviewed" by two people, before being accepted and published in Sociétés without any substantial editing.
 In May 2017, Peter Boghossian and James Lindsay published an absurd paper in the American open access journal Cogent Social Sciences which argued that the penis is best understood not as a biological organ but rather as a social construct. The paper came to an absurd conclusion that the conceptual penis is a "driver behind much of climate change". The authors' goal was to expose bias towards extreme ideologies in social science and gender studies. Critics of the sting operation argue that it did not demonstrate the existence of such biases, despite the authors' goals of doing so. Émile P. Torres of Salon, for example, argued that the sting shows only that academic journals that require authors to pay for papers to be published have a financial inclination "to accept papers regardless of quality." He also noted that none of the editorial board members of Cogent Social Sciences have expertise in gender studies. James E. McWilliams criticized the authors' motives and race, writing that "Boghossian and Lindsay are white men working in the most male-dominated academic fields (philosophy and math) attempting to humiliate through bullying one of the few academic fields dominated by women. In our current political climate—thriving as it does on shamelessness and humiliation—this scenario, as the motives become increasingly transparent, only calls for kind of scrutiny and understanding that gender studies can provide."
 The "Grievance Studies" affair (also referred to as the "Sokal Squared" Hoax by the news media): During 2017–2018 Helen Pluckrose, James A. Lindsay and Peter Boghossian wrote 20 hoax articles; at the time the hoax stopped, four papers had been published, three had been accepted but not yet published, seven were under review, and six had been rejected. The papers all focused on what the authors called "grievance studies" related to race, gender, sexuality and other forms of identity. The hoax was revealed and halted after one of the papers in the England-based feminist geography journal Gender, Place and Culture was criticized on social media, and then on Campus Reform, which led a Wall Street Journal editorial writer to investigate and report on it. The paper, which was in the process of being retracted when the Wall Street Journal story broke, referred to dog parks as "petri dishes for canine rape culture". The report also described a paper published in Affilia which contained a reworded excerpt from Mein Kampf.

Theology
 Maarten Boudry, a philosopher, in 2012 persuaded two theology conferences to accept abstracts composed of meaningless word salads as a paper.

See also
 List of animals with fraudulent diplomas
 List of hoaxes
 List of religious hoaxes
 Predatory open-access publishing
 Parody science / spoof science

References

Academic scandals
Academic publishing
Literature lists
Deception operations
Research-related lists
Lists of publications in science
Ethically disputed research practices